Blondes is a New York City-based electronic duo. The band consists of Sam Haar and Zach Steinman. The group is signed to RVNG Intl.

Discography

Studio albums

Extended plays

Singles

References

Electronic music duos